Andrea Doria has been borne by five ships of the Italian military and merchant navy, after Andrea Doria and may refer to:

 , a pre-dreadnought battleship completed in 1891, stricken in 1911, used as a defensive floating battery during World War I, and scrapped in 1929
 , a dreadnought battleship completed in 1916 and stricken in 1956 which saw service in both World War I and World War II
 , an ocean liner launched in 1951 and sunk in 1956
 , a missile-launcher cruiser commissioned in 1964 and decommissioned in 1992
 , an  destroyer commissioned in 2007.

See also
  (1910s–1950s)
  (1960s–1990s)

Italian Navy ship names